The Blessing may refer to:
 The Blessing (jazz quartet), a British jazz rock quartet, now known as Get the Blessing
 The Blessing (novel), a novel by Nancy Mitford
 The Blessing (rock band), a British rock band
 The Blessing (David "Fathead" Newman album), 2009
 The Blessing (Kari Jobe album), 2020
 "The Blessing (song)", a 2020 song by Kari Jobe, Cody Carnes and Elevation Worship

See also 
 Blessing (disambiguation)